The Soviet Union men's national under-18 and under-19 basketball team was a men's junior national basketball team of the Soviet Union. It represented the country in international under-18 and under-19 (under age 18 and under age 19) basketball competitions, until the dissolution of the Soviet Union in 1991. In 1992, CIS men's national under-18 basketball team represented the Commonwealth of Independent States in international under-18 competitions. After 1992, the successor countries all set up their own national teams.

FIBA Under-19 World Championship participations

FIBA Under-18 European Championship participations

See also
Soviet Union men's national basketball team
Soviet Union men's national under-16 basketball team
Soviet Union women's national under-19 basketball team
Russia men's national basketball team
Russia men's national under-19 basketball team

References

U
Men's national under-19 basketball teams